Nandeibam is a small region at the west bank of Kongba river, running about 1 km south of Kongba Market, Imphal East District, Manipur, India. It has a population of few hundreds and is divided into two regions - the Nandeibam Leikai and the Kongba Makha Nandeibam Leikai. In fact, Nandeibam is a family name associated with the indigenous people of Manipur.

References
Nandeibam Blog at Nandeibam

Imphal East district